Victor Galitski is an American physicist, a theorist in the areas of condensed matter physics and quantum physics.

Education and career
Galitski earned his PhD in applied math in 1999 (under Prof. Dmitry Sokoloff  from the Math Faculty in Moscow State University) and a  PhD in condensed matter physics under Prof. Anatoly Larkin in 2002. Galitski was later a postdoctoral fellow  at the Kavli Institute for Theoretical Physics.  He has been on the faculty at the University of Maryland since 2005, where he is now a Chesapeake Chair Professor of Theoretical Physics. He is also a Fellow of the Joint Quantum Institute there, an honorary professor at Monash University in Melbourne, Australia, and a foreign partner of the Australian ARC Centre of Excellence in Future Low-Energy Electronics Technologies (FLEET).   

Galitski has been awarded the NSF career award, Simons Investigator award, the George Soros Fellowship, and the Future Fellowship from Australian Research Council.
His notable researches include the 2010 prediction of topological Kondo insulators. In 2006, he introduced  a new kind of spin-orbit coupled Bose-Einstein Condensate. 
In 2007, together with University of Maryland coworkers including Sankar Das Sarma, Galitski resolved the  minimal conductivity puzzle in graphene physics. Together with Gil Refael, Galitski co-introduced Floquet topological insulators.  

In July  2021, Galitski published a viral essay on linkedin, entitled "Quantum Computing Hype is Bad for Science," cautioning about  unsupported, inflated claims in the quantum computing industry and the dangerous possibility of "quantum Ponzi schemes."

Books

Family background
Victor Galitski was born in Moscow, Russia in a family of  Jewish, German, and Russian  ancestry. His grandfather Victor Galitskii was a renowned  physicist, who worked with Lev Landau, and Arkady Migdal, and was director of the Theoretical Physics Department in the Kurchatov Institute.

External links

Theoretical physicists
21st-century American physicists
Russian physicists
Condensed matter physicists
American physicists
University of Maryland, College Park faculty
Living people
Year of birth missing (living people)